Zolman is a surname. Notable people with the surname include:

Greg Zolman, American football player
Shanna Zolman (born 1983), American basketball player

See also
Zoltán

German-language surnames